Sânmărtean is a surname. Notable people with the surname include:

 Lucian Sânmărtean (born 1980), Romanian footballer
 Dinu Sânmărtean (born 1981), Romanian footballer, brother of Lucian

See also
 Sânmartin (disambiguation)

Romanian-language surnames